David Felgate (born 19 March 1964) is a former English professional tennis player who competed for Great Britain in the 1980s.

Career
Felgate was principally a doubles player and it was in doubles that he made the semi-finals of the boys' event at the 1982 US Open, partnering Stuart Bale.

He and fellow Englishman Steve Shaw were doubles champions in the 1985 Bordeaux Open. It would be his only title on the Grand Prix tennis circuit. Also that year, in Wimbledon, Felgate won his first Grand Slam doubles match. Felgate and Nick Brown, wild card entrants, upset third seeds Ken Flach and Robert Seguso in the first round, before losing in the second round. He also reached the second round at Wimbledon in 1986, with Shaw, and in 1988, with Nick Fulwood.

He made his first Grand Slam singles appearance in 1988. After going through qualifying, Felgate played against Eddie Edwards in the first round of the 1988 Australian Open. He lost heavily to the South African, only winning three games during the match. He had previously only played singles on the Challenger circuit, and never in a Grand Prix event. When he did debut at a Grand Prix tournament, in the 1988 Stella Artois Championships, Felgate defeated world number 72 Jérôme Potier. He was given a wild card at Wimbledon that year, but had to play top seed Ivan Lendl in the first round, and lost in straight sets.

In 1992, Felgate started coaching Tim Henman and remained with him for nine years. During this time Henman made two Wimbledon semi-finals and won seven ATP titles. They decided to part ways early in 2001 and Felgate then began working with Xavier Malisse. He has also spent time coaching Naomi Cavaday and Nicole Vaidišová.

He has had a long association with the Lawn Tennis Association. He was Manager of Men's National Training there from 1992 until 1996 and their Performance Director from 2003 to 2006.

Grand Prix career finals

Doubles: 1 (1–0)

Challenger titles

Doubles: (4)

References

1964 births
Living people
English male tennis players
English tennis coaches
People from Barnes, London
Tennis people from Essex
British male tennis players